Archibald David Kennedy, 7th Marquess of Ailsa, OBE, DL (3 December 1925 – 7 April 1994) was a Scottish peer, the son of Angus Kennedy, 6th Marquess of Ailsa.

In early life, as David Kennedy, he worked as a steam locomotive fireman and, as Marquess, ran the Isle of Man Railway as lessee for the 1967–1971 seasons.

He married Mary (3 May 1916 – 17 August 2007, Edinburgh), daughter of coal miner John Burn, of Amble, Northumberland, on 7 April 1954 and they had three children:

Lady Elizabeth Helen Kennedy (b. 23 February 1955)
Archibald Angus Charles Kennedy, 8th Marquess of Ailsa (13 September 1956 – 15 January 2015)
Lord David Thomas Kennedy, 9th Marquess of Ailsa (b. 3 July 1958)

References

External links

Deputy Lieutenants of Ayrshire and Arran
Officers of the Order of the British Empire
1925 births
1994 deaths
People educated at Pangbourne College
Scots Guards officers
Royal Scots Fusiliers officers
British Army personnel of World War II
Archibald
Scottish people of Dutch descent
Schuyler family
Van Cortlandt family
7